The Big Brain is a 1933 American pre-Code drama film directed by George Archainbaud and written by Sy Bartlett and Warren Duff. The film stars George E. Stone, Phillips Holmes, Fay Wray, Minna Gombell and Lilian Bond. The film was released on August 5, 1933, by RKO Pictures.

Cast
Phillips Holmes as Terry Van Sloan
George E. Stone as Max Werner
Fay Wray as Cynthia Glennon
Minna Gombell as Margy
Lilian Bond as Dorothy Norton
Reginald Owen as Lord Darlington
Berton Churchill as Col. Higginbotham
Reginald Mason as Lord Latham
Sam Hardy as Slick Ryan
Charles McNaughton as Wallack
Lucien Littlefield as Justice of the Peace

Plot
A ruthless small time crook's rise from backroom bookie in a barber shop to that of high stakes international con artist. Max Werner gets rich as he moves from gambling to crooked stocks and bond dealing. Fleeing the authorities, he absconds to England where he continues his deceptions and setting up fake companies. Following a newspaper exposé of an accomplice, he double-crosses another and returns to America with his girlfriend, where a trap awaits him.

References

External links
 

1933 films
American black-and-white films
RKO Pictures films
Films directed by George Archainbaud
1933 drama films
American drama films
1930s English-language films
1930s American films